Everybody Wins may refer to: 
Everybody Wins (1930 film), a French film directed by René Pujol and Hans Steinhoff
Everybody Wins (1990 film), an American film directed by Karel Reisz starting Debra Winger and Nick Nolte
"Say My Name" (Breaking Bad), a television episode originally entitled "Everybody Wins"
Everybody Wins Independent Movement, a former political party in Venezuela